The Great Alaskan Mystery is a 1944 Universal film serial about government agents trying to stop Nazi spies from getting their hands on futuristic weapons.

Plot

James 'Jim' Hudson, an adventurer and accompanied by allies, goes after Nazi agents who have a new death ray called the Paratron...

Cast
 Milburn Stone as Jim Hudson
 Marjorie Weaver as Ruth Miller
 Edgar Kennedy as Bosun Higgins
 Samuel S. Hinds as Herman Brock
 Martin Kosleck as Dr Hauss
 Ralph Morgan as Dr Miller
 Joseph Crehan as Bill Hudson
 Fuzzy Knight as "Grit" Hartman
 Harry Cording as Captain Greeder
 Anthony Warde as Brandon

Critical reception
The author of a book on movie serials, William C. Cline, considers this to be a mediocre serial but possessing a good cast and all the necessary "ingredients" of a good serial.

Chapter titles
 Shipwrecked Among Icebergs (18 min 03s)
 Thundering Doom (18 min 56s)
 Battle in the Clouds (17 min 02s)
 Masked Murder (17 min 32s)
 The Bridge of Disaster (17 min 46s)
 Shattering Doom (16 min 34s)
 Crashing Timbers (15 min 35s)
 In a Flaming Plane (17 min 24s)
 Hurtling Through Space (17 min 19s)
 Tricked by a Booby Trap (17 min 04s)
 The Tunnel of Terror (16 min 37s)
 Electrocuted (17 min 42s)
 The Boomerang (16 min 34s)
Source:

See also
List of American films of 1944
 List of film serials by year
 List of film serials by studio
 List of films in the public domain in the United States

References

External links

Download or view online
 Great Alaskan Mystery at The Internet Archive (several formats available)

 
 
 
 
 
 

 
 
 
 
 
 

1944 films
American World War II films
World War II films made in wartime
American black-and-white films
1940s English-language films
Universal Pictures film serials
Films directed by Lewis D. Collins
Films directed by Ray Taylor
1944 adventure films
American adventure films
Films about Nazis
Films with screenplays by George H. Plympton